The Virgin Mary and Saint Francis Saving the World from Christ's Anger is a work by Peter Paul Rubens and his studio. It is linked to his  Saints Dominic and Francis Saving the World from Christ's Anger (Lyon). It is now in the Royal Museum of Fine Arts of Belgium in Brussels.

Sources

 

Paintings by Peter Paul Rubens
Paintings of Francis of Assisi
Paintings of the Virgin Mary
Paintings depicting Jesus
Collections of the Royal Museums of Fine Arts of Belgium
Maps in art
Snakes in art